Clayton W. "Russ" Nichols (born May 30, 1947, Glen Cove, New York) is an American retired slalom canoeist who competed in the 1970s. He finished 14th in the C-2 event at the 1972 Summer Olympics in Munich.

References
Sports-reference.com profile

External links

1947 births
Living people
American male canoeists
Canoeists at the 1972 Summer Olympics
Olympic canoeists of the United States
Sportspeople from Glen Cove, New York